The 369th Signal Battalion is a United States Army Signal Battalion. It is organized under the 15th Regimental Signal Brigade at Fort Gordon, GA. As a US Army Training and Doctrine Command unit, it serves as one of two battalions which provide Advanced Individual Training (AIT) to United States Army Signal Corps recruits.

Mission 
The 369th Signal Battalion transforms Soldiers into technically and tactically proficient Signal Warriors who are physically and mentally prepared to make an immediate positive impact to the Operational Army at their first unit of assignment; who know and live by the Soldier’s Creed, the Army Values, and understand the importance of teamwork.

Lineage  

Constituted 10 October 1944 in the Army of the United States as Headquarters and Headquarters Detachment, 3369th Signal Service Battalion

Activated 9 November 1944 in Alaska

Inactivated 11 March 1947 in Alaska

Redesignated 15 June 1969 as Headquarters and Headquarters Company, 369th Signal Battalion, allotted to the Regular Army, and activated in Vietnam

Inactivated 30 June 1971 in Vietnam

Headquarters transferred 23 September 1986 to the United States Army Training and Doctrine Command and activated at Fort Gordon, Georgia

Honors

Campaign Participation Credit

World War II: Asiatic-Pacific Theater, Streamer without inscription
Vietnam: Summer-Fall 1969; Winter-Spring 1970; Sanctuary Counteroffensive; Counteroffensive, Phase VII

Decorations
Meritorious Unit Commendation (Army) for ASIATIC-PACIFIC THEATER
Meritorious Unit Commendation (Army) for VIETNAM 1968–1970
Company A additionally entitled to:
Army Superior Unit Award for 1999–2000

Organization & Current Mission 
The current mission of the 369th Signal Battalion is to "Transform Soldiers into technically and tactically competent Warriors who live by the Soldier’s Creed, understand the importance of teamwork and are prepared, confident, and disciplined to take their place in the ranks of the Army."

The unit's current function is to train the following Signal Corps Military Occupational Specialties:

Headquarters & A Company (Alpha Spartans)
25U Signal Support Systems Specialist
B Company (Bravo Braves)
25C Radio Operator-Maintainer
25L Cable Systems Installer-Maintainer
25U Signal Support Systems Specialist
C Company (Charlie Rock)
25Q Multichannel Transmission Systems Operator-Maintainer
D Company (Delta Dawgs)
25U Signal Support Systems Specialist
E Company (deactivated 2016)(Echo Wolfpack)
25U Signal Support Systems Specialist

References 
 
 

Signal battalions of the United States Army